Gypsum Creek is a stream in Saline County, Kansas and McPherson County, Kansas, in the United States. The Maxwell Wildlife Refuge, which has herds of bison and elk is located in the headwaters of the Creek in McPherson County.

Gypsum Creek was likely named from reports of deposits of gypsum discovered on the Coronado expedition.

See also
List of rivers of Kansas

References

Rivers of McPherson County, Kansas
Rivers of Saline County, Kansas
Rivers of Kansas